Noureddine Hachouf (born 10 May 1940) is a former Algerian international footballer. He has 20 caps and 9 goals for the Algeria national team and played at the 1968 African Cup of Nations.

He was top scorer of the Algerian Championnat National in the 1966-67 season with 18 goals while playing for ES Guelma.

References

1940 births
Living people
Competitors at the 1967 Mediterranean Games
1968 African Cup of Nations players
Algeria international footballers
Algerian footballers
ES Guelma players
People from Guelma
Association football forwards
Mediterranean Games competitors for Algeria
Footballers at the 1965 All-Africa Games
African Games competitors for Algeria
21st-century Algerian people
20th-century Algerian people